Špitalič is a village in the Municipality of Kamnik in the Upper Carniola region of Slovenia.

Geography

The settlement is located in the Tuhinj Valley, on the road from Kamnik to Celje. It includes the hamlets of Jastroblje, Nova Reber (in older sources also Novo Rebro), Dolina, Bukovšek, Zobava, Kisovšek, Podlipovec, Strmšek, Pustotnik, and Petrživec.

Name
Špitalič was attested in historical documents as Pochsruke  in 1252, hospitale in Poxrukhe in 1255, and hospitale sancti Anthonii in Poxruk in 1261, among other names.
The name Špitalič derives from German Spital 'hospice' (see History below).

History

Next to the church can be seen the ruins of what was the Špitalič (Neuthal) Mansion, burned by the Yugoslav Partisans in January 1945. Part of the Carniolan estates held by the Counts of Andechs, the structure was originally a hospice offering shelter to the many travelers passing through the valley. It was built by the Andechs margrave Henry II of Istria about 1228, passing to Viktring Abbey circa 1251. It was sold and converted into a mansion in 1608 and subsequently rebuilt a number of times before its destruction.

Church

The church in the village is dedicated to Saint Anthony the Hermit and was originally built in the 13th century, but renovated in the 19th century in a Baroque style.

References

External links

Špitalič on Geopedia

Populated places in the Municipality of Kamnik